Catalabus elegans is a species of leaf rolling weevil in the beetle family Attelabidae found in Indomalaya.

References

Attelabidae
Beetles described in 1933